Churaman (died 1721) was a Jat chieftain of Sinsini, Rajasthan. He became leader of the Jats after Rajaram's death. Bahadur Shah I made him a mansabdar after he supported him against Muhammad Azam Shah in becoming the emperor. He was also made the faujdar of Mathura, and the imperial highway from Delhi to Agra was placed under his protection by the Mughal emperor. 

In 1702 after the death of Bhajja Singh, Raja Churaman Singh came to the fore. Within a short period Raja Churaman Singh gathered 500 horsemen and thousands of soldiers. Nand Ram, the Zamindar of Hathras, joined him along with 100 horsemen. Raja Churaman Singh recruited a well-known brigand of Mendoo and Mursan to his army. He constructed a fort Thoon, 150 km west of Agra. Within a short span there were 80 villages under the Thoon state and an army of 14 – 15 thousands.

References

Further reading

Year of birth missing
1721 deaths
Jat